The Avrămeni is a left tributary of the river Bașeu in Romania. It flows into the Bașeu in Hănești.

References

Rivers of Romania
Rivers of Botoșani County
Tributaries of the Bașeu